Angleton High School is a public high school located just outside the city of Angleton, Texas, United States in unincorporated  Brazoria County. It is classified as a 5A school by the University Interscholastic League (UIL). It is a part of the Angleton Independent School District located in south central Brazoria County. In 2015, the school was rated "Met Standard" by the Texas Education Agency.

Several previous school locations were destroyed by hurricanes. The high school was once located in what is now Central Elementary, as well as the former Angleton Intermediate School.  The recently built high school is located at 1 Campus Dr. on the outskirts of Angleton. The varsity football stadium and baseball field is located next to Angleton High School.

Angleton ISD serves Angleton as well as the Village of Bonney, the Rosharon census-designated place , and the unincorporated areas of Chocolate Bayou, Lochridge, Otey, and Sandy Point.

Athletics
The Angleton Wildcats compete in these sports - 

Baseball
Basketball
Cross Country
Football
Golf
Soccer
Softball
Swimming and Diving
Tennis
Track and Field
Volleyball

State Titles
Girls Basketball
1956(2A), 1973(3A)
Softball 
1994(5A), 2019(5A)
Boys Track
1969(3A)

Band 
The Angleton High School Marching Band is known as the "Purple Pride".

Theatre 
The Angleton High School Theatre department puts on a fall show every year along with other shows throughout the year including competing in the UIL One Act Play competition. The Angleton High School Theatre program also includes the Speech & Debate team, which competes in UIL, TFA, and NSDA. Angleton High School is a member of the Thespian Honor Society represented as Troupe 266.

Notable alumni

Sports
 Quandre Diggs - football player, defensive back for the Seattle Seahawks
 Mark Farris - former Texas A&M University quarterback and former shortstop in Pittsburgh Pirates minor league system
 Charley Frazier - American football player
 Gilbert Gardner - pro football linebacker, Super Bowl champion
 Ahmard Hall - starter for BCS Champions 2005 Texas Longhorns football team and former Tennessee Titans Fullback
 Quentin Jammer - football player, The University of Texas,  played 11 seasons as San Diego Chargers defensive back and his last season in 2013 for Denver Broncos.
 Henry Josey - CFL running back for Toronto Argonauts
 Tom Muecke - football player 
 Larry Stephens - NFL defensive end
 Rodney Terry - basketball head coach, Fresno State
 Emmitt Thomas - football player, Marshall High, NFL Hall of Fame with Kansas City Chiefs
 Keith Toston - CFL Calgary Stampeders running back
 Ray Willis - professional football player

Government
Greg Bonnen (Class of 1984), Republican member of the Texas House of Representatives from District 24 in Galveston County (2013-Present)
Drew B. Tipton (Class of 1985), District Judge for the United States District Court for the Southern District of Texas
Dennis Bonnen (Class of 1990), Republican member of the Texas House of Representatives from District 25 in Brazoria County (1997-2021) and 75th Speaker of the Texas House of Representatives.
Cody Vasut (Class of 2005), Republican member of the Texas House of Representatives from District 25 in Brazoria County (2021-Present)

References

External links 
 
 Angleton Athletics Twitter

Angleton, Texas
High schools in Brazoria County, Texas
Public high schools in Texas